

References

Sources

 
 
 

 
 
 

 
 

Lists of animals
Lists of plants
Animals
Animals in Norse mythology
Germanic